Şanlıurfa 11 Nisan Stadyumu is an olympic stadium in Şanlıurfa, Turkey. It is the home stadium of Şanlıurfaspor. The stadium holds  28,965 spectators and was opened in 2009.

Organizations
 The FIM FreeStyle Motocross World Championship :Over 15–16 May 2010, the international NIGHT of the JUMPs series is making a tour stop in the GAP Stadium in Şanlıurfa, Turkey.
 Turkey's EURO 2016 Bid :It was one of the 3 candidate reserve stadiums of Turkey's losing bid for EURO 2016.
 2009–2010 Ziraat Turkish Cup Final :Trabzonspor vs Fenerbahce Ziraat Turkish Cup Final was played in the Şanlıurfa GAP Stadium on 5 May 2010. Trabzonspor won this game 3–1.

References

External links
Urfa Haber

Football venues in Turkey
Sports venues completed in 2009
Şanlıurfaspor
Multi-purpose stadiums in Turkey
2009 establishments in Turkey